Amory's Tribute to the Heroes of 1861–1865 is a Confederate monument in Amory, Mississippi. It was erected in 1924 by the local chapter of the United Daughters of the Confederacy.

History 
The monument was erected in Amory, Mississippi in 1924 by the local chapter of the United Daughters of the Confederacy, during a time when many similar Confederate monuments were being erected throughout the Southern United States. The statue was originally located at the intersection of Main Street and First Avenue, but in either 1939 or 1945 (sources differ), the monument was relocated to Frisco Park in downtown Amory.

See also 
 1924 in art
List of Confederate monuments and memorials in Mississippi

Bibliography 

 
 
 

1924 establishments in Mississippi
Buildings and structures in Monroe County, Mississippi
Confederate States of America monuments and memorials in Mississippi
1924 sculptures
United Daughters of the Confederacy monuments and memorials